Taroq (also Romanized as Ţāroq, Ţāreq, Ţārq, and Taregh; also known as Tūrāk) is a village in  Nehbandan County, South Khorasan Province, Iran. At the 2006 census, its population was 280, in 101 families.

References 

 Populated places in Nehbandan County